is a 1924 novella by the Austrian writer Arthur Schnitzler. It has been adapted into films on a number of occasions including the German silent Fräulein Else (1929), the Argentine The Naked Angel (1946) and Fräulein Else (2014).

References

Bibliography
 Kohl, Katrin Maria and Robertson, Ritchie. A History of Austrian Literature 1918–2000. Camden House, 2006.

External links

Austrian novellas
Novels by Arthur Schnitzler
Austrian novels adapted into films
1924 German-language novels
Novels set in Italy
Sexuality in novels